Grover W. "Buddy" Turner, Jr. (August 15, 1923 – August 6, 1998) was an American politician. He was a member of the Arkansas House of Representatives, serving from 1961 to 1992. He was a member of the Democratic party.

References

1998 deaths
1923 births
20th-century American politicians
People from Calhoun County, Arkansas
Speakers of the Arkansas House of Representatives
Democratic Party members of the Arkansas House of Representatives